Abida pyrenaearia is a species of air-breathing land snail, a terrestrial pulmonate gastropod mollusc in the family Chondrinidae.

Geographic distribution
Abida pyrenaearia is found in central and western Pyrenees. The largest population is found in France with some subpopulations in Spain.

Ecology
The species can be found living on limestone rocks.

References

Chondrinidae
Gastropods of Europe
Gastropods described in 1831